Busale is a rural ward in Kyela District of the Mbeya Region of Tanzania. It is also one of the more populous wards in the district. In 2016 the Tanzania National Bureau of Statistics report there were 10,190 people in the ward, from 9,246 in 2012.

Located in the western part of Kyela District, Busale is bordered by three wards in the district: Ngana to the south and southwest, Itope to the south and southeast, and Ipande to the east. It is also bordered by Ileje District to the north and to the west.

Villages / vitongoji 
The ward has 5 villages and 20 vitongoji.

 Busale
 Busale
 Kabale
 Kanyasi
 Lupakano
 Nyibuko
 Sumbi
 Busoka
 Busoka
 Chivanje
 Ngokoto
 Ikomelo
 Busoka
 Ikombe
 Itembe
 Mahenge
 Lema
 Katyongoli
 Kubuguru
 Mafiga
 Sokoni
 Masoko
 Lwangwa
 Mwati
 Sanu

References 

Populated places in Mbeya Region